Gomphosus is a small genus of wrasses native to the Indian and Pacific Oceans.

Species
The currently recognized species in this genus are:
 Gomphosus caeruleus Lacépède, 1801 (green birdmouth wrasse)
 Gomphosus varius Lacépède, 1801 (bird wrasse)

References

 
Labridae
Marine fish genera
Taxa named by Bernard Germain de Lacépède